Slavery in Egypt existed up until the early 20th century.  It differed from the previous slavery in ancient Egypt, being managed in accordance with Islamic law from the conquest of the Caliphate in the 7th century until the practice stopped in the early 20th-century, having been gradually abolished in the late 19th century.

During the Islamic history of Egypt, slavery were mainly focused on three categories: male slaves used for soldiers and bureaucrats, female slaves used for sexual slavery as concubines, and female slaves and eunuchs used for domestic service in harems and private households.  At the end of the period, there were a growing agricultural slavery.  The people enslaved in Egypt during Islamic times mostly came from Europe and Caucasus (referred to as "white"), or from the Sudan and Africa South of the Sahara through the Trans-Saharan slave trade (referred to as "black").

Fatimid Caliphate

Harem slavery

The Abbasid harem system came to be a role model for the harems of later Islamic rulers, and the same model can be found in subsequent Islamic nations during the Middle Ages, including the harem of the Fatimid Caliphate in Egypt. The Fatimid harem consisted of the same model as the Abbasid harem, and was organized in a model in which the mother took the first rank, followed by slave concubines who became umm walad when giving birth; ensalved female Jawaris entertainers, enslaved female stewardesses named qahramana's, and eunuchs.

The Mamluk era

Military slavery
From 935 to 1250, Egypt was controlled by dynastic rulers, notably the Ikhshidids, Fatimids, and Ayyubids.  Throughout these dynasties, thousands of Mamluk servants and guards continued to be used and even took high offices. The Mamluks were essentially enslaved mercenaries. Originally the Mamluks were slaves of Turkic origin from the Eurasian Steppe, but the institution of military slavery spread to include Circassians, Abkhazians, Georgians, Armenians, and Russians, as well as peoples from the Balkans such as Albanians, Greeks, and South Slavs (see Saqaliba).

This increasing level of influence among the Mamluk worried the Ayyubids in particular. Because Egyptian Mamluks were enslaved Christians, Islamic rulers did not believe they were true believers of Islam despite fighting for wars on behalf of Islam as slave soldiers.

In 1250, a Mamluk rose to become sultan.  The Mamluk Sultanate survived in Egypt from 1250 until 1517, when Selim captured Cairo on 20 January. Although not in the same form as under the Sultanate, the Ottoman Empire retained the Mamluks as an Egyptian ruling class and the Mamluks and the Burji family succeeded in regaining much of their influence, but as vassals of the Ottomans.

Ottoman Egypt: 1517–1805

Harem slavery
The Mamluk aristocrats, who were themselves often Circassian or from Georgia, preferred to marry women of similar ethnicity, while black slave women were used as domestic maids, and the majority of the wives and concubines of the Mamluk have been referred to as "white slaves".  The white slave women bought to become concubines and wives of the Mamluks were often from the Caucasus (Circassians or Georgian) who were sold to slave traders by their poor parents.

It was common practice for the men of the Egyptian Mamluk upper class to marry a woman who had previously been the slave concubine of either themselves or another Mamluk, and the practice of marrying the concubine or the widow of another Mamluk were a way of normal Mamluk alliance policy.  The marriage between Murad Bey and Nafisa al-Bayda, widow of Ali Bey al-Kabir, was an example of this marriage policy, similar to that of Shawikar Qadin, the concubine of Uthman Katkhuda (d. 1736), who were given in marriage by Abd al-Rahman Jawish to Ibrahum Katkhuda (d. 1754) after the death of Uthman Katkhuda.

Muhammad Ali dynasty: 1805–1914

The number of slaves in Egypt has been estimated to be at least 30,000 slaves in Egypt at any time in the 19th-century. In Egypt, the slave concubines in the harems of rich Egyptian men were often Circiassian women, while the concubines of middle class Egyptians were often Abyssinians; while the male and female domestic slaves of allmost all classes of Egyptian society often consisted of Black Africans. Black Africans were also used as slave soldiers as well as enslaved agricultural workers.

Slave trade

The Egyptian slave dealers in Egypt were mainly from the Oases and from Upper Egypt. The slave traders were organized in a guild with a shaykh, and divided into dealers in black and in white slaves respectively. Cairo was the main depot of slaves and the base of the slave trade, but the annual mawlid of Ṭanṭā was another important occasion for trading in slaves.

Colored slaves were trafficked to Egypt via several different routes: from Darfur to Asyūṭ; from Sennar to Isnā; from the area of the White Nile; from Bornu and Wadāy by way of Libya; and, finnally, from from Abyssinia and the East African by way of the Red Sea. White slaves were trafficked to Egypt from the Black Sea area by way of Istanbul.

Agricultural slavery
The use of Sudanese in agriculture become fairly common under Muhammad Ali of Egypt and his successors. Agricultural slavery was virtually unknown in Egypt at this time, but the rapid expansion of extensive farming under Muhammad Ali and later, the world surge in the price of cotton caused by the American Civil War, were factors creating conditions favourable to the deployment of unfree labour.  The slaves worked primarily on estates owned by Muhammad Ali and members of his family, and it was estimated in 1869, that Khedive Isma'il and his family had 2,000 to 3,000 slaves on their main estates as well as hundreds more in their sugar plantations in Upper Egypt.

Harem slavery
The royal harem during the Muhammad Ali dynasty of the Khedivate of Egypt (1805-1914) was modelled after Ottoman example, the khedives being the Egyptian vice roys of the Ottoman sultans. Similar to the Ottoman Imperial harem, the harem of the khedive was modelled on a system of polygyny based on slave concubinage, in which each wife or concubine was limited to having one son.

The khedive's harem was composed of between several hundreds to over a thousand enslaved women, supervised by his mother, the walida pasha, and his four official wives (hanim) and recognized concubines (qadin).   However, the majority of the slave women served as domestics to his mother and wives, and could have servant offices such as the bash qalfa, chief servant slave woman of the walida pasha.

The enslaved female servants of the khedivate harem were manumitted and married off with a trosseau in strategic marriages to the male slaves (kul or mamluk) who were trained to become officers and civil servants, in order to ensure the fidelity of their husband's to the khedive when they begun their military or state official career.

A minority of the slave women were selected to become the personal servants (concubines) of the khedive, often selected by his mother: they could become his wives, and would in any case become free as an umm walad (or mustawlada) if they had children with him.

The Egyptian elite of bureaucrate families, who emulated the khedive, had similar harem customs, and it was noted that it was common for Egyptian upper-class families to have slave women in their harem, which they manumitted to marry off to male protegees.   Muhammad Ali of Egypt reportedly had at least 25 consorts (wives and concubines), and Khedive Ismail fourteen.

The women harem slaves mostly came from Caucasus and were referred to as "white".

This system slowly and gradually started to change after 1873, when Tewfik Pasha married Emina Ilhamy as his sole consort, making monogamy the fashionable ideal among the elite, after the throne succession had been changed to primogeniture, which favored monogamy.  Around the same time, the Ottoman Tanzimat reforms abolished the custom of training male slaves to become military men and civil servants, and replaced them with free students.

Military slavery

To prepare for the training of his Sudanese slave army, Muhammad Ali sent a corps of Mamluks to Aswan where, in 1820, he had new barracks built to house them. The head of the military academy at Aswan was a French officer who had served under Napoleon, Colonel Octave-Joseph Anthelme Sève, who became a Muslim and is known in Egyptian history as Sulayman Pasha al-Faransawi. When they arrived in Aswan, each of the Sudanese was vaccinated and given a calico vest, then instructed in Islam. The exact numbers of Sudanese brought to Aswan and Muhammad Ali's other military training centre at Manfalut is not known, but it is certain that a great number died en route. Of those who arrived, many died of fevers, chills and the dryness of the climate. Of an estimated 30,000 Sudanese brought to Aswan in 1822 and 1823, only 3,000 survived.

After 1823, Muhammad Ali's priority was to reduce the cost of garrisoning Sudan, where 10,000 Egyptian infantry and 9,000 cavalry were committed.  The Egyptians made increasing use of enslaved Sudanese soldiers to maintain their rule, and relied very heavily on them. A more or less official ratio was established, requiring that Sudan provide 3,000 slaves for every 1,000 soldiers sent to subjugate it. This ratio could not be achieved however because the death rate of slaves delivered to Aswan was so high. Muhammad Ali's Turkish and Albanian troops that partook in the Sudan campaign were not used to weather conditions of the area and attained fevers and dysentery while there with tensions emerging and demands to return to Egypt. In addition the difficulties of capturing and raising an army from Sudanese male slaves during the campaign were reasons that led Muhammad Ali toward eventually recruiting local Egyptians for his armed forces.

Abolition

The Ottoman Empire granted Egypt the status of an autonomous vassal state or Khedivate in 1867. Isma'il Pasha (Khedive from 1863 to 1879) and Tewfik Pasha (Khedive from 1879 to 1892) governed Egypt as a quasi-independent state under Ottoman suzerainty until the British occupation of 1882, after which it came under British influence. This influenced the policy around slavery in Egypt.

The Anglo-Egyptian Slave Trade Convention or Anglo-Egyptian Convention for the Abolition of Slavery in 1877 officially banned the slave trade to Sudan, thus formally putting an end on the import of slaves from Sudan.   Sudan was at this time the main import of male slaves to Egypt. This ban was followed in 1884 by a ban on the import of white women; this law was directed against the import of white women (mainly from Caucasus and usually Circassians), which were the preferred choice for harem concubines among the Egyptian upper class.  The import of male slaves from Sudan as soldiers, civil service and eunuchs, as well as the import of female slaves from Caucasus as harem women were the two main sources of slave import to Egypt, thus these laws were, at least on paper, major blows on Slavery in Egypt.  Slavery itself was not banned, only the import of slaves. However a ban on the sale on existing slaves was introduced alongside a law giving existing slaves the legal right to apply for manumission.

The anti slavery reforms gradually diminished the Khedive harem, though the harem of the Khedive as well as the harems of the elite families still maintained a smaller amount of both male eunuchs as well as slave women until at least World War I.   Khedive Abbas II of Egypt are noted to have bought six "white female slaves" for his harem in 1894, ten years after this had formally been banned, and his mother still maintained sixty slaves as late as 1931.

Gallery

References

Egypt
Human rights abuses in Egypt